Oranga Tamariki, also known as the Ministry for Children and previously the Ministry for Vulnerable Children, is a government department in New Zealand responsible for the well-being of children, specifically children at risk of harm, youth offenders and children of the State. It is the successor agency of the former department, Child, Youth and Family (CYF).

Functions and structure
The minister responsible for Oranga Tamariki is the Minister for Children, a position currently held by Kelvin Davis. On 31 October 2017, it was announced that the ministry would be renamed to Oranga Tamariki — Ministry for Children. Oranga Tamariki is guided by the United Nations Convention on the Rights of the Child.

The organisation is headed by a chief executive and consists of three major clusters: "Service Delivery", "Voices and Quality", and "Enabling Functions." Services Delivery consists of a "Partnering for Outcomes" group, two "Services for Children and Families" groups (one in the North Island and one in the South Island), a "Youth Justice Services" group, and a "Care Services" group. The "Voices and Quality" cluster consists of a Tamariki Advocate/Voices of Children group and a Chief Social Worker/Professional Practice group. The "Enabling Functions" cluster consists of the "Policy, Investment and Evidence" group and a "Leadership and Organisational Development group." Each of these groups is headed by a deputy chief executive.

Under the provisions of the Oranga Tamariki Act 1989 and Oranga Tamariki (Residential Care) Regulations 1996, the Office of the Children's Commissioner (OCC) has some oversight over Oranga Tamariki. These responsibilities including encouraging Oranga Tamariki to develop of policies and services designed to promote the welfare of children and young people, and receiving reports from Oranga Tamariki inspectors visiting the homes of children in residential care each year.

History
Oranga Tamariki is the successor organisation to the former Child, Youth and Family (CYF) department, which was dissolved down by the Fifth National Government in March 2017. Oranga Tamariki, initially known as the Ministry for Vulnerable Children, formally came into existence in November 2017. Following the formation of a Labour-led coalition government in October 2017, the Ministry for Vulnerable Children was renamed the Ministry for Children.

From May 2018 to June 2019, there were 39 reported physical assaults against the organisation's social workers.

In November 2019, Oranga Tamariki (with the Ministry of Education) investigated sex acts at a Catholic primary school in Wellington.

2019 "Uplifting" controversy

On 11 June 2019, the news website Newsroom published a series of stories including a documentary called The Uplift criticising Oranga Tamariki's practice of "uplifting" or separating children from their parents. Newsroom argued that Oranga Tamariki's "uplifting" policies disproportionately targeted Māori and Pasifika children, claiming that three Māori babies were being "uplifted" from their mothers a week. According to Newsroom's report, 70% of children "uplifted" in 2018 came from Māori and Pasifika backgrounds.

This attracted considerable media coverage and public discussion. Former Māori Party leader Dame Tariana Turia demanded the resignation of Oranga Tamariki chief executive Grainne Moss. By contrast, former Families Commissioner Christine Rankin defended Oranga Tamariki's actions and criticised Newsroom for allegedly spinning it into a "race issue." Meanwhile, Christian advocacy group Family First New Zealand called for the Government to establish a fully independent watchdog for Oranga Tamariki.

On 12 June 2019, Oranga Tamariki pursued legal action against Newsroom, seeking orders for cuts to Newsroom's The Uplift story that it disputed. The agency also defended its practice of "uplifting" children, arguing that these actions were done to ensure the safety of children. On 13 June, the Family Court declined Oranga Tamariki's bid to force Newsroom and news website Stuff to change details to The Uplift story.
In response to public interest, the Children's Minister Tracey Martin announced that she would meet with local iwi Ngāti Kahungunu and the Māori Council to defuse the situation. On 16 June, Martin announced that the Government would be conducting a review into Oranga Tamariki's attempted uplifting in the case of a Hawkes Bay mother and her child. The review will be led by the Chief Social Worker at Oranga Tamariki while a person appointed by Ngāti Kahungunu will provide independent oversight. On 18 June, Prime Minister Jacinda Ardern ruled out a royal commission of inquiry into Oranga Tamariki's practices.

On 22 August 2019, Oranga Tamariki signed an agreement with the North Island iwi Ngāi Tūhoe to ensure that fewer Māori children end up in state care. As part of the agreement, Oranga Tamariki will deal with at-risk Tūhoe children through its Whakatane office to ensure that children were moved from state care into family homes. Earlier in the year, Oranga Tamariki had signed similar partnership agreements with other Māori iwi including Waikato Tainui, Ngāi Tahu and Ngāpuhi.

In October 2019, it was reported that Oranga Tamariki was charging an Auckland dad $110 per hour to see his son. During that same month, Hawke's Bay parents refused to participate in a government review, claiming a lack of trust in the investigation.

Moss announced in January 2021 that she was "stepping down" from her position.

COVID-19 pandemic
During the COVID-19 pandemic in New Zealand, the Minister of Health, Chris Hipkins, issued a press statement in mid-August 2020 rejecting rumours circulating within the Māori and Pacific Islander communities that Oranga Tamariki was taking away children whose parents had tested positive for COVID-19.

Attempted uplifting of "Moana"
In 2021, Oranga Tamariki was involved in a custody dispute over a Māori girl referred to as "Moana". The dispute was between Moana's Pakeha (New Zealand European) foster parents, "the Smiths", and Moana's iwi, Ngāti Kahungunu. The six year old Moana, who had experienced abuse and neglect at the hands of her birth mother, had been living with the Smiths for three years since 2018 in the Hawke's Bay region. The ministry and Ngāti Kahungunu wanted Moana to be placed with an elderly Māori woman known as "Mrs Taipa" and her daughter ("Ms Taipa") on the grounds that the Smiths could not meet her Māori cultural needs. On 9 September 2021, Judge Peter Callinicos dismissed Oranga Tamariki's application for Moana to be removed from the Smiths. He also criticised Oranga Tamariki for allegedly "putting ideology ahead of the child's best interests" and rejected their assertion that the Smiths were stripping Moana of her whakapapa (genealogy). Callinicos also criticised the ministry for not helping the Smiths to meet Moana's cultural needs and inaccurate statutory reports.

On 10 September, Moana's birth mother filed an appeal against Judge Callinicos's decision. Ngahiwi Tomoana, the head of Ngāti Kahungunu, who had supported the ministry's application, called for the decision to be appealed and claimed that uplifting separated Māori children from their families and communities. The mother's lawyer Janet Mason and Oranga Tamariki argued that Judge Callinicos had misapplied the statutory cultural provisions of the Oranga Tamariki Act 1989, had mischaracterised or overlooked evidence due to his alleged bias, and disregarded Moana's cultural and familial needs. On 9 November 2022, Wellington High Court Justice Helen Cull dismissed Moana's birth mother's appeal on all grounds and ruled that Moana could remain in the care of her Pakeha foster parents. 

In early December 2022, Mason appealed the High Court's decision to the Supreme Court of New Zealand, arguing that the 2019 amendments to the Oranga Tamariki Act strengthened Treaty of Waitangi commitments. 

On 20 March 2023, the Smiths relinquished custody of Moana, citing the stress caused by the ongoing legal battle for her care caused by the ongoing appeals, lack of support from Oranga Tamariki's Napier office, and numerous false reports of abuse. Mrs Smith described the decision as "heartbreaking" and stated that they were "still grieving the loss of our daughter in our home" and wanted Moana to be part of their family's lives. Oranga Tamariki's East Coast regional manager Julie Tangaere described Moana's case as "highly sensitive" and "distressing," but asserted that its involvement had been consistent with the implementation of the Court's plans. Former Assistant Māori Commissioner for Children Glenis Philip-Barbara stated that Māori children deserved to be both safe and with their whanau (family).

June 2021 assault video 
In late June 2021 a whistleblower informed the news website Newsroom about incidents where Oranga Tamariki staff members allegedly physically assaulted children being housed at Oranga Tamariki's Care & Protection Residences. The report raised concerns about the welfare of children in their care along with the use of restraints and physical force. This led to the closure of such facilities in July 2021.

Malachi Subecz abuse case
In October 2022, the Chief Ombudsman Peter Boshier released a scathing report into Oranga Tamariki's handling of the case of five year old Tauranga toddler Malachi Subecz, who was murdered by his caregiver Michaela Barriball in November 2021. Barriball had been looking after the boy whose mother had been imprisoned. Boshier described the department's response as "a litany of failures" and criticised Oranga Tamariki for not prioritising Malachi's welfare. In late June 2022, Barriball had been sentenced to a life sentence of at least 17 years after pleading guilty to two charges of ill-treating a child and a murder charge. While In Barriball's care, Malachi had been beaten, starved, thrown against walls, and burnt with scalding water by his caregiver. Barriball's sister Sharon Barriball was also convicted of perverting the course of justice by concealing evidence and sentenced to six months home detention.

Malachi's relatives including his aunt Helen Menzies criticised Oranga Tamariki's handling of Malachi's case, stating that his death was preventable and that the government department had failed him. In mid October 2022, Oranga Tamariki acknowledged that it had failed to act on at least two reports by Malachi's stepfather and a Corrections Department probation officer expressing concerns about Malachi's wellbeing. The Minister for Children Kelvin Davis confirmed that Oranga Tamariki accepted the findings of the Ombudsman's report but delayed taking further action until a review of the Oranga Tamariki child care system had been completed. In response, the Māori Party co-leader Debbie Ngarewa-Packer criticised Davis' decision to delay action, stating that "a delayed approach meant atrocities were likely continuing."  Ngarewara-Packer advocated implementing mandatory reporting as an interm measure.

In early December 2022, a second independent report by former health official Dame Karen Poutasi into Oranga Tamariki and other agencies' handling of the Malachi case was released. In addition to Oranga Tamariki, her investigation examined the responses of other government departments and agencies including the Corrections Department, Ministry of Education, Ministry of Health, Ministry of Social Development, and the New Zealand Police. Poutasi criticised these organisations for ignoring people who raised concerns about Malachi's wellbeing and failing to report or act upon signs of abuse. Poutasi made 14 recommendations including requiring Oranga Tamariki to vet proposed carers in the event a solo parent is taken into custody and requiring professionals and services working with children to report suspected abuse to Oranga Tamariki. Poutasi's report was welcomed by Malachi's parents as a vindication of their view that the child's death could have been prevented had Oranga Tamariki acted. Similar sentiments were expressed by Minister of Children Kelvin Davis. Stuff also reported that Oranga Tamariki's Tauranga office, which oversaw Subecz's case, experienced high workload pressures, a high number of unallocated cases, inadequate site capacity, and significant burnout and stress among staff members.

In early December 2022, Newshub reported that the Government had accepted 9 of Poutasi's 14 recommendations including comparing medical records to gain a full picture of a child's health and promoting regular public awareness campaigns dealing with child abuse. However, the Government stated that it would consider the five remaining recommendations including vetting the caregivers of imprisoned parents, regular follow-up checks and implementing the mandatory reporting of suspected abuses to Oranga Tamariki. Davis confirmed that three of the senior staff working on Subecz's case were no longer working with the agency. Two of the individuals had resigned while a third had been dismissed. In addition, Associate Education Minister Jan Tinetti confirmed that the early childhood centre Subecz attended had also lost its license in November 2022.

List of ministers for children
The following ministers have held the office of Minister for Children.

References

External links
Ministry for Children, Oranga Tamariki webpage

  

Politics of New Zealand
Children's rights in New Zealand
New Zealand Public Service departments